Chiranjeevi (Kannada: ಚಿರಂಜೀವಿ) is a 1936 Indian Kannada film, directed by K.P. Bhave. The film stars Devudu, Sharada, Malavalli Sundaramma and Basavaraju Mansoor. The film had musical score by Sheshgiri Rao.

Cast
Devudu
Sharada
Malavalli Sundaramma
Basavaraju Mansoor
R S Murthy
Narayanrao
Krishnarao Nadgir

References

External links
 

1930s Kannada-language films